Mostros is the fifth and last studio album recorded by Mexican rock  band Maldita Vecindad y los Hijos del Quinto Patio. The LP was released on September 15, 1998 under the BMG label.

Track listing

 El Malasuerte
 Patineto
 El Cocodrilo
 El Teporocho
 Camaleón
 El Barzón
 Caer
 El Tieso y la Negra Soledad
 2 de Octubre
 Tatuaje
 Mostros
 Sirena (hidden track)

Personnel
 Roco - vocals
 Aldo - guitars
 Pato - bass
 Pacho - drums
 Sax - saxophones
 

1998 albums
Maldita Vecindad albums